Deer Ridge is a residential neighbourhood in the southeast quadrant of Calgary, Alberta. It is located in the Bow River valley, and is bounded to the north by Canyon Meadows Drive, to the east by Deercliff Road and the Bow River, to the south by Deerfield Circle and the community of Deer Run and to the west by Bow Bottom Trail. Fish Creek Provincial Park is located immediately east.

The land was annexed into the City of Calgary in 1961, and Deer Ridge was established in 1978. It is represented in the Calgary City Council by the Ward 14 councillor.

Demographics

Residents in this community had a median household income of $59,149 in 2000, and there were 17.1% low income residents living in the neighbourhood. As of 2000, 15.2% of the residents were immigrants. A proportion of 10.5% of the buildings were condominiums or apartments, and 36% of the housing was used for renting.

Education
The community is served by Don Bosco Elementary & Junior High school adjacent from Wilma Hansen Junior High School.

See also
List of neighbourhoods in Calgary

References

External links
Deer Ridge Community Association

Neighbourhoods in Calgary